Barb is a feminine given name, often a short form (hypocorism) of Barbara. It is also sometimes a surname.

People

Given name
 Barb Bellini (born 1977), Canadian retired volleyball player
 Barbara Barb Bond (b. 1962), American former rugby union player, United States team captain in 1991
 Barbara Barb Bunkowsky (born 1958), Canadian former LPGA golfer
 Barbara Barb Goodwin (born 1949), American politician
 Barb Haley (born 1963/64), American politician
 Barb Honchak (born 1979), American professional mixed martial artist
 Barb Jungr (born 1954), English singer, songwriter, composer and writer
 Barbara Lindquist (born 1969), American triathlete
 Barbara Barb Miller (born 1958/59), Canadian politician
 Barb Mucha (born 1961), American LPGA golfer
 Barbara Barb Spencer (born 1966), Canadian curler
 Barb Tarbox (1961–2003), Canadian anti-smoking activist
 Barb Whitehead (born 1961), American LPGA golfer
 Barb Yarusso (born 1956), American politician

Surname
 Alphons Barb (1901-1979), Austrian-born academic, archaeologist, numismatist, museum director and author
 Heinrich Alfred Barb (1826-1883), academic, university director, civil servant, interpreter and author, director of the Oriental Institute of Vienna

Nicknamed
 Louis Barbarin (1902-1997), American jazz drummer nicknamed "Lil Barb"

Fictional characters
 Barbara "Barb" Holland, on the 2016 Netflix series Stranger Things
 Barbara Henrickson, on HBO's TV series Big Love
 Barbara Royle, on the BBC comedy series The Royle Family; often referred to as "Barb" by her husband, Jim Royle.
 Barbara Barb Leahey, on the Canadian TV series Trailer Park Boys
 Barb, on the TV series Witches of East End
 Queen Barb, from Trolls World Tour

See also
 Barbe, including Barbé
 Barb (disambiguation)
 Barbara (disambiguation)

English feminine given names
English-language feminine given names
Hypocorisms